Igor Đurić (born 22 February 1985) is a Serbian football defender who last played for OFK Bačka.

Club career
On 23 June 2009, the SC Heerenveen agreed a deal with FK Vojvodina Novi Sad that saw the 24-year-old central defender sign a four-year contract until 30 June 2013 with the Eredivisie side. He left Heerenveen by mutual consent end of August 2011 and signed at Emirati club Sharjah in November. On 28 June 2012 he signed his second contract with Novi Sad's FK Vojvodina.

International career
He was a Serbia-Montenegro U19 international during the 2004 UEFA European Under-19 Championship qualifying round.

He made his debut for the senior side in November 2008, a friendly match 6–1 Bulgaria. The then played three more friendlies, including a 4 nation-tournament hosted by Cyprus.

Honours
Vojvodina
Serbian Cup Runner-up: 2006–07
Heerenveen
Johan Cruyff Shield Runner-up: 2009

References

External links

reprezentacija.rs
Igor Đurić at Soccerway

1985 births
Living people
Footballers from Novi Sad
Serbian footballers
Serbia international footballers
FK Srem players
FK Vojvodina players
FK Rad players
OFK Bačka players
SC Heerenveen players
Serbian SuperLiga players
Eredivisie players
Association football defenders
Serbian expatriate footballers
Expatriate footballers in the Netherlands
Expatriate footballers in the United Arab Emirates
Expatriate footballers in Turkey
Serbian expatriate sportspeople in the Netherlands
Serbian expatriate sportspeople in the United Arab Emirates
Serbian expatriate sportspeople in Turkey